Be Quick 1887 is a football club from Groningen, Netherlands. The club was established in 1887, and is currently playing in the  Vierde Divisie.

History

19th century 
Be Quick 1887 was founded on 4 October 1887 by students of a local gymnasium. The club joined the football competition in 1895, and was placed in the Tweede Klasse Noord, then the highest tier of football in the northern districts of the country.

20th century 
Be Quick joined the newly established Eerste Klasse in 1916, and would remain in the league until the introduction of professional football in the Netherlands in 1954.

The heyday of Be Quick came between 1915 and 1926. The club won the title in the northern football competition in every season except for 1925. On 6 June 1920, Be Quick won the national football title, by defeating VOC of Rotterdam, champion of the western football league, 4–0. Of that team, goalkeeper Deck Ruijter Zylker was the only player who wouldn't make it to the Netherlands national football team.

When professional football was introduced in the Netherlands, in 1954, Be Quick joined the professional leagues. They were placed in the Tweede Divisie, where they won the 1959–60 title. Be Quick played in the Eerste Divisie for a number of seasons, but withdrew from the ranks of professional football after the 1963–64 season.

Upon returning to the amateur football structure, Be Quick were placed in the Tweede Klasse (now Eerste Klasse). The club were promoted to the Hoofdklasse in 1992, suffered relegation to the Eerste Klasse in 1995 and to the Tweede Klasse in 1997. After one season in the Tweede Klasse, the club returned to the Eerste Klasse, finishing the first season there in second place and winning the title in the second season, 1999–2000.

21st century 
The club was relegated back to the Eerste Klasse in 2002, but secured promotion a year later, and has played in the Hoofdklasse since. They were promoted to the Topklasse in 2013, but went relegated after one only season in the top Dutch amateur level. Two seasons later they returned to the renamed Derde Divisie by placing second in Hoofdklasse C.

Stadium
The successes between 1915 and 1926 allowed the club to buy a piece of land to the south of the city of Groningen. Stadion Esserberg was then built, designed by architect Evert van Linge, one of the players of the team that won the national title in 1920. The stadium had a capacity of 18,000 when it was built, and now is located in the territory of the municipality of Haren, just a mere four kilometers south of Groningen. Nowadays, it has hosted to the Eurovoetbal tournament.

Honours
National football title: 1
 1919–20
Tweede Divisie: 1
 1959–60
Northern football competition: 18
 1895–96, 1896–97, 1905–06, 1914–15, 1915–16, 1916–17, 1917–18, 1918–19, 1919–20, 1920–21, 1921–22, 1922–23, 1923–24, 1925–26, 1935–36, 1936–37, 1937–38, 1940–41
Eerste Klasse: 2
 1991–92, 1999–2000

External links
Official website

 
Football clubs in the Netherlands
Football clubs in Groningen (city)
Association football clubs established in 1887
1887 establishments in the Netherlands
Multi-sport clubs in the Netherlands